Prochoreutis holotoxa is a moth of the family Choreutidae. It is known from China (Shanxi), France (Alps), Italy, Austria (Tirol), Switzerland (Zermatt), Romania and Russia (Siberia).

The larvae feed on Pedicularis ascendens.

References

External links
lepiforum.de

Prochoreutis
Moths of Europe